Menahem Golan (May 31, 1929 – August 8, 2014, originally Menachem Globus) was an Israeli film producer, screenwriter, and director. He was best known for co-owning The Cannon Group with his cousin Yoram Globus. Cannon specialized in producing low-to-mid-budget American films, primarily genre films, during the 1980s after Golan and Globus had achieved significant filmmaking success in their native Israel during the 1970s.

Golan produced films featuring actors such as Sean Connery, Sylvester Stallone, Chuck Norris, Jean-Claude Van Damme, and Charles Bronson, and for a period, was known as a producer of comic book-style films like Masters of the Universe, Superman IV: The Quest for Peace, Captain America, and his aborted attempt to bring Spider-Man to the silver screen. Golan also wrote and "polished" numerous film scripts under the pen name Joseph Goldman. At the time of his death, Golan had produced over 200 films, directed 44, and won 8 "Kinor David" awards as well as "Israel Prize" in Cinema. He was nominated for a BAFTA Award for Best Foreign-Language Film for Franco Zeffirelli's Otello.

Early life
Born Menachem Globus in Tiberias in then British Mandate of Palestine (now Israel), his parents were Jewish emigrants from the Russian Empire. He spent his early years in Tiberias, then studied directing at the Old Vic School and the London Academy of Music and Dramatic Art, and filmmaking at New York University. During the Israeli War of Independence, Golan served as a pilot in the Israeli Air Force.

Film career

Golan started as an apprentice at Habima Theater in Tel Aviv. After completing his studies in theater direction, he staged plays in Israel. He gained experience as a filmmaker by working as an assistant to Roger Corman.

Golan is probably best known as a director for his film Operation Thunderbolt (Mivtsa Yonatan, 1977), about the Israeli raid on Entebbe airport in Uganda. He also produced Eskimo Limon (Lemon Popsicle, 1978), a film that spawned many sequels and an American remake, The Last American Virgin (1982).

An adaptation of the Isaac Bashevis Singer novel The Magician of Lublin (1979) was followed by the musical The Apple (1980). An unusual moral fable with a rock-disco soundtrack, The Apple routinely appears on lists of all-time-worst movies, earning it cult film status.

Golan's production company The Cannon Group produced a long line of films during the 1980s and early 1990s, including Delta Force, Runaway Train, and some of the Death Wish sequels. In 1986, Cannon was taken over by Pathe Communications. Golan produced several comic book-style movies in the last half of the 1980s, most notably Masters of the Universe, based on the toys of that name and inspired by the comics of Jack Kirby. In 1987, Cannon gained infamy after its UK-based production of Superman IV: The Quest for Peace failed in theaters and provoked a negative backlash from fans. Golan resigned from Cannon in 1989, and by 1993 the company had folded. After Cannon's collapse, Golan became head of 21st Century Film Corporation and produced several low to medium-budget films.

Golan hoped to film Spider-Man in 1986 at Cannon Studios in the United Kingdom, and to shoot the exteriors in Tel Aviv. Dolph Lundgren was envisioned as the Green Goblin, and Spider-Man creator Stan Lee was approached to make a cameo as J. Jonah Jameson. Golan struggled for years to produce the Marvel Comics character, but he finally failed when 21st Century Film Corporation went bankrupt and closed in 1996 (along with Carolco Pictures, another company that had agreed to help finance the film). Sony Pictures eventually purchased the Spider-Man rights and produced the first film in 2002. That year, Golan released his adaptation of Crime and Punishment.

Personal 
Golan was married to Rachel (1930-2015), makeup artist and had three daughters, clinical psychologist and psychoanalyst Ruth Golan (born 1953), Naomi (1958-2015) and Yael (born 1964). His cousin was Israeli-American producer Yoram Globus.

Death 
Whilst visiting Jaffa, Tel Aviv, with family members on the morning of August 8, 2014, Golan collapsed. He lost consciousness, and attempts to resuscitate him failed. He was 85 years old.

Filmography

Awards and recognition
1978: Nomination for the Academy Award for Best Foreign Language Film Operation Thunderbolt
1984: Won the Golden Raspberry Award for Worst Picture Bolero
1986: Nomination for Golden Raspberry Award for Worst Picture Cobra
1987: Nomination for Golden Raspberry Award for Worst Picture Tough Guys don't dance
In 1999, Golan was awarded the Israel Prize for his contribution to cinema.
In 1994 Golan was awarded the Ophir Prize of the Israeli Film Academy for his Lifetime Achievement.
The movie theater in the Azrieli building in Tel Aviv bore the name of the Golan-Globus company. It was closed in 2008.

See also
List of Israel Prize recipients
Cinema of Israel

References

External links

1929 births
2014 deaths
Action film directors
The Cannon Group, Inc. people
English-language film directors
Israel Prize in cinema recipients
Israeli film producers
Israeli film directors
Israeli Jews
Israeli people of Polish-Jewish descent
People from Tiberias
Tisch School of the Arts alumni